Lech Wałęsa (born 29 September 1943) is a Polish statesman, dissident, and Nobel Peace Prize laureate, who served as the President of Poland between 1990 and 1995. After winning the 1990 election, Wałęsa became the first democratically elected President of Poland since 1926 and the first-ever Polish President elected by popular vote. A shipyard electrician by trade, Wałęsa became the leader of the Solidarity movement, and led a successful pro-democratic effort, which in 1989 ended Communist rule in Poland and ushered in the end of the Cold War.

While working at the Lenin Shipyard (now Gdańsk Shipyard), Wałęsa, an electrician, became a trade-union activist, for which he was persecuted by the government, placed under surveillance, fired in 1976, and arrested several times. In August 1980, he was instrumental in political negotiations that led to the ground-breaking Gdańsk Agreement between striking workers and the government. He co-founded the Solidarity trade-union, whose membership rose to over ten million.

After martial law in Poland was imposed and Solidarity was outlawed, Wałęsa was again arrested. Released from custody, he continued his activism and was prominent in the establishment of the Round Table Agreement that led to the semi-free 1989 Polish legislative election and a Solidarity-led government. He presided over Poland's transition from Marxist–Leninist state socialism into a free-market capitalist liberal democracy, but his active role in Polish politics diminished after he narrowly lost the 1995 Polish presidential election. In 1995, he established the Lech Wałęsa Institute.

Since 1980, Wałęsa has received hundreds of prizes, honors and awards from multiple countries and organizations worldwide. He was named the Time Person of the Year (1981) and one of Time's 100 most important people of the 20th century (1999). He has received over forty honorary degrees, including from Harvard University and Columbia University, as well as dozens of the highest state orders, including the Presidential Medal of Freedom, the Knight Grand Cross of the Order of the Bath, and the French Grand Cross of Legion of Honour. In 1989, Wałęsa was the first foreign non-head of state to address the Joint Meeting of the U.S. Congress. The Gdańsk Lech Wałęsa Airport has borne his name since 2004.

Early life
Wałęsa was born in Popowo, Reichsgau Danzig-West Prussia, Germany (German-occupied Poland). His father, Bolesław Wałęsa (1908–1945), was a carpenter who was rounded up and interned in a forced labour camp at Młyniec (outpost of KL Stutthof) by the German occupying forces before Lech was born. Bolesław returned home after the war but died two months later from exhaustion and illness. Lech's mother, Feliksa Wałęsa (née Kamieńska; 1916–1975), has been credited with shaping her son's beliefs and tenacity.

When Lech was nine, Feliksa married her brother-in-law, Stanisław Wałęsa (1916–1981), a farmer. Lech had three elder full siblings; Izabela (1934–2012), Edward (born 1937), and Stanisław (born 1939); and three younger half-brothers; Tadeusz (born 1946), Zygmunt (born 1948), and Wojciech (1951–1988). In 1973, Lech's mother and stepfather emigrated to the US for economic reasons. They lived in Jersey City, New Jersey, where Feliksa died in a car accident in 1975, and Stanisław died of a heart attack in 1981. Both of them were buried in Poland.

In 1961, Lech graduated from primary and vocational school in nearby Chalin and Lipno as a qualified electrician. He worked as a car mechanic from 1961 to 1965, and then embarked on his two-year, obligatory military service, attaining the rank of corporal before beginning work on 12 July 1967 as an electrician at Lenin Shipyard , now called Gdańsk Shipyard in Gdańsk.

Solidarity movement

From early in his career, Wałęsa was interested in workers' concerns; in 1968 he encouraged shipyard colleagues to boycott official rallies that condemned recent student strikes. He was a charismatic leader, who helped organize the illegal 1970 protests at the Gdańsk Shipyard when workers protested the government's decree raising food prices and he was considered for the position of chairman of the strike committee. The strikes' outcome, which involved the deaths of over 30 workers, galvanized Wałęsa's views on the need for change. In June 1976, Wałęsa lost his job at the Gdańsk Shipyard because of his continued involvement in illegal unions, strikes, and a campaign to commemorate the victims of the 1970 protests. Afterwards, he worked as an electrician for several other companies but his activism led to him continually being laid off and he was jobless for long periods. Wałęsa and his family were under constant surveillance by the Polish secret police; his home and workplace were always bugged. Over the next few years, he was arrested several times for participating in dissident activities.

Wałęsa worked closely with the Workers' Defence Committee (KOR), a group that emerged to lend aid to people arrested after the 1976 labor strikes and to their families. In June 1978, he became an activist of the underground Free Trade Unions of the Coast (Wolne Związki Zawodowe Wybrzeża). On 14 August 1980, another rise in food prices led to a strike at the Lenin Shipyard in Gdańsk, of which Wałęsa was one of the instigators. Wałęsa climbed over the shipyard fence and quickly became one of the strike leaders. The strike inspired other similar strikes in Gdańsk, which then spread across Poland. Wałęsa headed the Inter-Enterprise Strike Committee, coordinating the workers at Gdańsk and at 20 other plants in the region. On 31 August, the government, represented by Mieczysław Jagielski, signed an accord (the Gdańsk Agreement) with the Strike Coordinating Committee. The agreement granted the Lenin Shipyard workers the right to strike and permitted them to form an independent trade union. The Strike Coordinating Committee legalized itself as the National Coordinating Committee of the Solidarność (Solidarity) Free Trade Union, and Wałęsa was chosen as chairman of the committee. The Solidarity trade union quickly grew, ultimately claiming over 10 million members—more than a quarter of Poland's population. Wałęsa's role in the strike, in the negotiations, and in the newly formed independent trade union gained him fame on the international stage.

On 10 March 1981, through the introduction of his former superior in the army,  Wałęsa met Wojciech Jaruzelski for the first time in the office building of the Council of Ministers for three hours. During the meeting, Jaruzelski and Wałęsa agreed that mutual trust was necessary if the problems of Poland were to be solved. Wałęsa said "It's not the case that the name of socialism is bad. Only some people spoiled the name of socialism". He also complained about and criticized the government. Jaruzelski informed Wałęsa of the coming war games of the Warsaw Pact from 16 to 25 March, hoping he could help maintain the social order and avoid anti-Soviet remarks. Jaruzelski also reminded Wałęsa that Solidarity had used foreign funds. Wałęsa joked "We don't have to take only dollars. We can take corn, fertilizer, anything is okay. I told Mr. Kania before that I would take everything from the enemy. The more the better, until the enemy was weakened no more".

Wałęsa held his position until 13 December 1981, when General Jaruzelski declared martial law in Poland. Wałęsa and many other Solidarity leaders and activists were arrested; he was incarcerated for 11 months until 14 November 1982 at Chylice, Otwock, and Arłamów; eastern towns near the Soviet border. On 8 October 1982, Solidarity was outlawed. In 1983, Wałęsa applied to return to the Gdańsk Shipyard as an electrician. The same year, he was awarded the Nobel Peace Prize. He was unable to accept it himself, fearing Poland's government would not let him back into the country. His wife Danuta accepted the prize on his behalf.

Through the mid-1980s, Wałęsa continued underground Solidarity-related activities. Every issue of the leading underground weekly publication Tygodnik Mazowsze bore his motto, "Solidarity will not be divided or destroyed". Following a 1986 amnesty for Solidarity activists, Wałęsa co-founded the Provisional Council of NSZZ Solidarity (Tymczasowa Rada NSZZ Solidarność), the first overt legal Solidarity entity since the declaration of martial law. From 1987 to 1990, he organized and led the semi-illegal Provisional Executive Committee of the Solidarity Trade Union. In mid-1988, he instigated work-stoppage strikes at the Gdańsk Shipyard.  He was frequently hauled in for interrogations by the Polish secret police, the Security Service, during the 1980s. On many of these occasions, Danuta—who was even more anti-Communist than her husband—was known to openly taunt Security Service agents when they picked Lech up.

After months of strikes and political deliberations, at the conclusion of the 10th plenary session of the Polish United Workers' Party (PZPR, the Polish communist party), the government agreed to enter into Round Table Negotiations that lasted from February to April 1989. Wałęsa was an informal leader of the non-governmental side in the negotiations. During the talks, he traveled throughout Poland giving speeches in support of the negotiations. At the end of the talks, the government signed an agreement to re-establish the Solidarity Trade Union and to organize semi-free elections to the Polish parliament; in accordance with the Round Table Agreement, only members of the Communist Party and its allies could stand for 65 percent of the seats in the lower house, the Sejm.

In December 1988, Wałęsa co-founded the Solidarity Citizens' Committee; this was ostensibly an advisory body but in practice a political party that won the parliamentary elections in June 1989. Solidarity took all the seats in the Sejm that were subject to free elections, and all but one seat in the newly re-established Senate. Wałęsa was one of Solidarity's most public figures; he was an active campaigner, appearing on many campaign posters, but did not run for parliament himself. Solidarity winners in the Sejm elections were referred to as "Wałęsa's team" or "Lech's team" because they had all appeared on their election posters with Wałęsa.

While ostensibly only chairman of Solidarity, Wałęsa played a key role in practical politics. In August 1989, he persuaded leaders of parties formerly allied with the Communist Party to form a non-communist coalition government—the first non-Communist government in the Soviet Bloc. The parliament elected Tadeusz Mazowiecki as the first non-communist Prime Minister of Poland in over forty years.

Presidency

Following the June 1989 parliamentary elections, Wałęsa was disappointed that some of his former fellow campaigners were satisfied to govern alongside former Communists. He decided to run for the newly re-established office of president, using the slogan, "I don't want to, but I have to" ("Nie chcę, ale muszę."). On 9 December 1990, Wałęsa won the presidential election, defeating Prime Minister Mazowiecki and other candidates to become Poland's first freely elected head of state in 63 years, and the first non-Communist head of state in 45 years. In 1993, he founded his own political party, the Nonpartisan Bloc for Support of Reforms (BBWR); the grouping's Polish-language acronym echoed that of Józef Piłsudski's "Nonpartisan Bloc for Cooperation with the Government," of 1928–35, likewise an ostensibly non-political organization.

During his presidency, Wałęsa saw Poland through privatization and transition to a free-market economy (the Balcerowicz Plan), Poland's 1991 first completely free parliamentary elections, and a period of redefinition of the country's foreign relations. He successfully negotiated the withdrawal of Soviet troops from Poland and won a substantial reduction in foreign debts.

Wałęsa supported Poland's entry into NATO and the European Union, both of which occurred after his presidency, in 1999 and 2004, respectively. In the early 1990s, he proposed the creation of a sub-regional security system called NATO bis. The concept was supported by right-wing and populist movements in Poland but garnered little support abroad; Poland's neighbors, some of which (e.g. Lithuania), had recently regained independence and tended to see the proposal as Polish neo-imperialism.

Wałęsa has been criticized for a confrontational style and for instigating "war at the top", whereby former Solidarity allies clashed with one another, causing annual changes of government. This increasingly isolated Wałęsa on the political scene. As he lost political allies, he came to be surrounded by people who were viewed by the public as incompetent and disreputable. Mudslinging during election campaigns tarnished his reputation. Some thought Wałęsa, an ex-electrician with no higher education, was too plain-spoken and too undignified for the post of president. Others thought him too erratic in his views or complained he was too authoritarian and that he sought to strengthen his own power at the expense of the Sejm. Wałęsa's national security advisor Jacek Merkel credited the shortcomings of Wałęsa's presidency to his inability to comprehend the office of the president as an institution. He was an effective union leader capable of articulating what the workers felt but as president he had difficulty delegating power or navigating bureaucracy. Wałęsa's problems were compounded by the difficult transition to a market economy; in the long run it was seen as highly successful but it lost Wałęsa's government much popular support.

Wałęsa's BBWR performed poorly in the 1993 parliamentary elections; at times his popular support dwindled to 10 percent and he narrowly lost the 1995 presidential election, winning 33.11 percent of the vote in the first round and 48.28 percent in the run-off against Aleksander Kwaśniewski, who represented the resurgent Polish post-Communist Democratic Left Alliance (SLD). Wałęsa's fate was sealed by his poor handling of the media; in televised debates he appeared incoherent and rude;  in response to Kwaśniewski's extended hand at the end of the first of the two debates, he replied that the post-Communist leader could "shake his leg". After the election, Wałęsa said he was going into "political retirement" and his role in politics became increasingly marginal.

Post-presidency
After losing the 1995 election, Wałęsa announced he would return to work as an electrician at the Gdańsk Shipyard. Soon afterwards, he changed his mind and chose to travel around the world on a lecture circuit. Wałęsa developed a portfolio of three lectures ("The Impact of an Expanded NATO on Global Security", "Democracy: The Never-Ending Battle" and "Solidarity: The New Millennium"), and reads them at universities and public events with an appearance fee of around £50,000 ($70,000).

In 1995, he founded the Lech Wałęsa Institute, a think tank with a mission "to popularize the achievements of Polish Solidarity, educate young generations, promote democracy, and build civil society in Poland and around the world". In 1997, he founded a new party, Christian Democracy of the 3rd Polish Republic, hoping it would help him to successfully run in future elections.

Wałęsa's contention for the 2000 presidential election ended with a crushing defeat when he polled 1.01 percent of the vote. His humiliation was increased because Aleksander Kwaśniewski, who was re-elected in the first round with 54 percent of the vote, is a former Communist apparatchik. Wałęsa polled in seventh place, after which he announced his withdrawal from Polish politics.

In 2006, Wałęsa quit Solidarity in protest of the union's support of the ruling right-wing Law and Justice party, and Lech and Jarosław Kaczyński—twin brothers who had been prominent in Solidarity and were now serving as the country's president and prime minister, respectively. The main point of disagreement was the Kaczyńskis' focus on rooting out those who had been involved in communist rule and their party's attempt to make public all the files of the former communist secret police. Until then only members of the government and parliament had to declare any connection with the former security services. Wałęsa and his supporters argued the so-called transparency legislation advocated by the government might turn into a witch hunt and the more than 500,000 Poles who had possibly collaborated with the communist secret police could face exposure.

In 2011, Wałęsa rejected Lithuania's Order of Vytautas the Great as a result of constant discrimination on the part of the Lithuanian government towards its Polish minority.

Wałęsa was well known for his conservative stance on LGBT rights. In 2013, he said on Polish television that "he doesn't wish for this minority, which he tolerates and understands, to impose itself on the majority". Referring to Robert Biedroń, he argued that, considering that as they represent less than one percent of the Polish society, proportionally speaking, homosexual MPs should sit "in the last row of the parliament, or even behind its walls". After sharp international criticism, including City authorities of San Francisco's decision to rename Walesa Street as a result of those remarks, Wałęsa apologized for his comments, stressing that "being a man of old date, in his view one's sexual orientation should lie in one's intimate sphere". He said that "his intentions were distorted by the media" and "homosexuality should be respected". Over the last few years, Wałęsa has voiced his support for the introduction of same-sex marriage in Poland and has repeatedly met with Biedroń, whom he called "a talent" and "a future President of Poland".

In 2013, Wałęsa suggested the creation of a political union between Poland and Germany.

In 2014, in a widely publicized interview, Wałęsa expressed his disappointment in another Nobel laureate, US president Barack Obama: he told CNN, "When he was elected there was great hope in the world. We were hoping that Obama would reclaim moral leadership for America, but that failed ...  in terms of politics and morality America no longer leads the world". Wałęsa also accused Obama of not deserving his Nobel Peace Prize; during the 2012 US presidential campaign he endorsed Obama's opponent Mitt Romney. In September 2015, Wałęsa again hit the headlines after sharing his thoughts on the migrant crisis in Europe with media, saying, "watching the refugees on television, I noticed that ... they are well fed, well dressed and maybe even are richer than we are ... If Europe opens its gates, soon millions will come through and while living among us will start exercising their own customs, including beheading".

In August 2017, ten Nobel Peace Prize laureates, including Wałęsa, urged Saudi Arabia to stop the executions of 14 young people for participating in the 2011–12 Saudi Arabian protests.

Wałęsa and secret police

Despite the 2000 ruling of a special lustration court affirming his innocence, for many years there have been allegations that Wałęsa was an informant of Security Service, the communist security services, in his twenties. While vehemently denying being a regular Security Service informer, Wałęsa admitted to "signing something under interrogation in the 1970s." In 2017, a handwriting study ordered by the government-controlled Institute of National Remembrance (INR), stated that signatures on several documents from the 1970s belonged to Wałęsa. The exact nature of Wałęsa's relationship with Security Service to this day remains a contentious question among historians.

The controversy resurfaced in 2008 with the publication of a book that purported to show that Wałęsa, codenamed Bolek, had been an operative for the security services from 1970 to 1976.

The question resurfaced again in February 2016, when the Institute of National Remembrance seized materials from the widow of Chief of secret police gen. Czesław Kiszczak, that were said to document Wałęsa's role as a spy for the security services.

Court ruling
On 12 August 2000, Wałęsa, who was running a presidential campaign at the time, was cleared by the special Lustration Court of charges that he collaborated with the Communist-era secret services and reported on the activities of his fellow shipyard workers, due to the lack of evidence. Anti-communists Piotr Naimski, one of the first members of the Workers' Defense Committee that led to the Solidarity trade union, and Antoni Macierewicz, Wałęsa's former Interior Minister, testified against him in the closed vetting trial. Naimski, who said he testified with a "heavy heart", expressed his disappointment that Wałęsa "made a mistake by not going openly to the public, and he has missed an important chance". According to Naimski, the court cleared Wałęsa on "technical grounds" because it did not find certain original documents—many of which had been destroyed since 1989—that offered sufficient proof that Wałęsa was lying.

In 1992, Naimski, as a head of the State Protection Office, started the process of screening people suspected of being Communist collaborators in Poland. In June that year, he helped Antoni Macierewicz prepare a list of 64 members of the government and parliament who were named as spies in the police records; these included Wałęsa, then the Polish president. Wałęsa's name was included on the list after a wrenching internal debate about the virtues of honesty versus political discretion. In response to the publication of this list, President Wałęsa immediately engineered the fall of prime minister Jan Olszewski and the dismissal of Interior Minister Macierewicz. A parliamentary committee later concluded Wałęsa had not signed an agreement with the secret police.

A 1997 Polish law made vetting a requirement for those seeking high public office. According to the law, it is not a crime to have collaborated, but those who deny it and are found to have lied are banned from political life for ten years. The 2000 presidential election was the first use of this law.

Despite helping Wałęsa in 2005 to receive the official status of a "victim of communist regime" from the Institute of National Remembrance (IPN), this court ruling did not convince many Poles. In November 2009, Wałęsa sued the president of Poland, Lech Kaczyński, over his repeated collaboration allegations. Five months later, Kaczyński failed to invite Wałęsa to the commemoration service at Katyn, which almost certainly saved Wałęsa's life because the presidential plane crashed, killing all on board. In August 2010, Wałęsa lost a libel case against Krzysztof Wyszkowski, his former fellow activist, who also publicly accused Wałęsa of being a communist agent in 1970s.

2008 book
The most comprehensive analysis of Wałęsa's possible collaboration with secret police was provided in a 2008 book  (The Security Service and Lech Wałęsa). The book was written by two historians from the Institute of National Remembrance, Sławomir Cenckiewicz and Piotr Gontarczyk, and included documents from the archives of the secret police that were inherited by the institute. Among the documents were registration cards, memos, notes from the secret police, and reports from the informant.

The book's authors said Wałęsa, working under the code name Bolek, was a secret police informant from 1970 (after he was released from arrest) until 1976 (before he was fired from the shipyard). According to them, "he wrote reports and informed on more than 20 people and some of them were persecuted by the communist police. He identified people and eavesdropped on his colleagues at work while they were listening to Radio Free Europe for example". The book describes the fate of the seven of his alleged victims; information regarding others was destroyed or stolen from the files. According to them, Wałęsa received over 13,000 zlotys as remuneration for his services from the Security Service, while the monthly salary at the time was about 3,500 zlotys. The authors said oppositionist activity in Poland in the first half of 1970s was minimal and Wałęsa's role in it was quite marginal. However, according to the book, despite formally renouncing his ties with Security Service in 1976, Wałęsa went on to have contacts with communist officials.

The book also said that during his 1990–1995 presidency, Wałęsa used his office to destroy the evidence of his collaboration with the secret police by removing incriminating documents from the archives. According to the book, historians discovered that with the help of the state intelligence agency, Wałęsa, Interior Minister Andrzej Milczanowski, and other members of Wałęsa's administration had borrowed from the archives the secret police files that had connections to Wałęsa, and returned them with key pages removed. When it was discovered at the turn of 1995/96, the following prosecutorial inquiry was discontinued for political reasons despite the case attracting much public attention.

Sławomir Cenckiewicz also said that in 1983, when Wałęsa was nominated for the Nobel Peace Prize, the secret police tried to embarrass him and leaked information about Wałęsa's previous collaboration with the government. By this time though, Wałęsa was already so popular that most Poles did not believe the official media and dismissed the allegations as a manipulation by the Communist authorities. The book's first print run sold out in Poland within hours. The book received substantial coverage in the media, provoked nationwide debate, and was noted by the international press. Wałęsa vowed to sue the authors but never did.

Kiszczak archives
On 18 February 2016, the government-affiliated INR in Warsaw announced it had seized a package of original documents that allegedly proved Wałęsa was a paid Security Service informant. The documents dated from the period 1970–1976; they were seized from the home of a recently deceased former interior minister, General Czesław Kiszczak. The documents' authenticity was confirmed by an archival expert, but the prosecutors demanded a handwriting examination. Eventually, the requested examination concluded that the documents were authentic, which suggest he was a paid informant. Wałęsa previously said that he had signed a commitment to inform document, but that he had never acted on it.

The dossier consists of two folders. The first is a "personal file" containing 90 pages of documents, including a handwritten commitment to cooperate with Polish Security Service dated 21 December 1970, and signed Lech Wałęsa – Bolek with a pledge he would never admit his collaboration with secret police "not even to family"; the file also contains the confirmations of having received funds. The second is a "work file" which contains 279 pages of documents, including numerous reports by Bolek on his co-workers at Gdańsk Shipyard, and notes by Security Service officers from meetings with him. According to one note, Wałęsa agreed to collaborate out of fear of persecution after the workers' protest in 1970. The documents also show that at first Bolek eagerly provided information on the opinions and actions of his co-workers and took money for the information, but his enthusiasm diminished and the quality of his information decreased until he was deemed no longer valuable and collaboration with him was terminated in 1976.

The sealed dossier also contained a letter, hand-written by Kiszczak in April 1996, in which he informs the Director of the Polish Central Archives of Modern Records (Archiwum Akt Nowych) about the accompanying files documenting the collaboration of Wałęsa with the Polish Security Service and asks him not to publish this information until five years after Wałęsa's death. In his letter, Kiszczak said he kept the documents out of reach: before the 1989 revolution, trying to protect Wałęsa's reputation; and afterwards to make sure they did not disappear or were used for political reasons. This letter and the accompanying documents had never been sent.

On 16 February 2016, about three months after Kiszczak's death, his widow Maria approached the Institute of National Remembrance and offered to sell the documents to the archives for 90,000 zlotys ($23,000). However, according to Polish law, all documents of the political police must be handed in to the state. The administration of the institute notified the prosecutor's office, which conducted a police search of the Kiszczaks' house and seized all the historic documents. Maria Kiszczak later said she had not read her husband's letter and had "made a mistake".

Wałęsa's response

For years, Wałęsa vehemently denied collaborating with the Polish Security Service and dismissed the incriminating files as forgeries created by the Security Service to compromise him. Wałęsa also denies that during his presidency he removed documents incriminating him from the archives. Until 2008, he denied having ever seen his Security Service file. After the publication of the book SB a Lech Wałęsa in 2008, he said that while he was president "I did borrow the file, but didn't remove anything from it. I saw there were some documents there about me and that they were clearly forgeries. I told my secretaries to tape up and seal the file. I wrote 'don't open' on it. But someone didn't obey, removed the papers, now casting suspicion on me." Wałęsa's interior minister Andrzej Milczanowski denied the cover-up and said he "had full legal rights to make those documents available to President Wałęsa" and that "no original documents were removed from the file", which contained only photocopies.

Wałęsa has offered conflicting statements regarding the authenticity of the documents. Initially he appeared to come close to an admission, saying in 1992, "in December 1970, I signed three or four documents" to escape from the secret police. In his 1987 autobiography A Way of Hope, Wałęsa said, "It is also the truth that I had not left that clash completely pure. They gave me a condition: sign! And then I signed." He denied he acted upon the collaboration agreement. However, in his later years Wałęsa said all the documents are forgeries and told the BBC in 2008, "you will not find any signature of mine agreeing to collaborate anywhere".

In 2009, after the publication of another biography connecting him with the secret police (Lech Wałęsa: Idea and History by Pawel Zyzak), Wałęsa threatened to leave Poland if historians continue to question his past. He said that before revealing such information "a historian must decide whether this serves Poland". After the accusations against him resurfaced with the discovery of the Kiszczak dossier on 16 February 2016, Wałęsa called the files "lies, slander and forgeries", and said he "never took money and never made any spoken or written report on anyone". He said of the Polish public, which was about to believe in the allegations, "you have betrayed me, not me you" and "it was I who safely led Poland to a complete victory over communism". On 20 February 2016, Wałęsa wrote in his blog that a secret police officer had begged him to sign the financial documents in the 1970s because the officer had lost money entrusted to him to purchase a vehicle. Wałęsa appealed to the officer to step forward and clear him of the accusations.

Personal life
On 8 November 1969, Wałęsa married Mirosława Danuta Gołoś, who worked at a flower shop near the Lenin Shipyard where Wałęsa worked. Soon after they married, she began using her middle name more often than her first name, per Lech's request. The couple had eight children; Bogdan (born 1970), Sławomir (born 1972), Przemysław (1974–2017), Jarosław (born 1976), Magdalena (born 1979), Anna (born 1980), Maria-Wiktoria (born 1982), and Brygida (born 1985). , Anna is running her father's office in Gdańsk and Jarosław is a European MP.

In 2008, Wałęsa underwent a coronary artery stent placement and the implantation of a cardiac pacemaker at the Houston Methodist Hospital in Houston, Texas. He underwent a heart operation in 2021. In January 2022, Wałęsa tested positive for COVID-19. He said he had received three doses of the COVID-19 vaccine.

Honors

In 1983, Wałęsa was awarded the Nobel Peace Prize. Since then, he has received more than 30 state decorations and more than 50 awards from 30 countries, including Order of the Bath (UK), Order of Merit (Germany), Legion of Honour (France) and European Human Rights Prize (EU 1989). In 2011, he declined to accept the Lithuanian highest order, citing his displeasure at Lithuania's policy towards the Polish diaspora. In 2008, he established the 

In 2004, Gdańsk International Airport was officially renamed Gdańsk Lech Wałęsa Airport and Wałęsa's signature was incorporated into the airport's logo. A college hall in Northeastern Illinois University (Chicago), six streets, and five schools in Canada, France, Sweden and Poland also were named after Lech Wałęsa

Wałęsa was named Man of the Year by Time magazine (1981), Financial Times (1980), Saudi Gazette (1989) and 12 other newspapers and magazines. He was awarded with over 45 honorary doctorates by universities around the world, including Harvard University and Sorbonne. He was named an honorary karate black belt by International Traditional Karate Federation. Wałęsa is also an honorary citizen of more than 30 cities, including London, Buffalo and Turin.

In the United States, Wałęsa was the first recipient of the Liberty Medal, in 1989. That year, he also received the Presidential Medal of Freedom and became the first non-head-of-state to address a joint meeting of the United States Congress. In 2000, Wałęsa received the Golden Plate Award of the American Academy of Achievement. Wałęsa symbolically represented Europe by carrying the Olympic flag at the opening ceremony of the 2002 Winter Olympics. In 2004, he represented ten newly acceded EU countries during the official accession ceremony in Strasbourg. In 1993, the heraldic authority of the Kingdom of Sweden assigned Wałęsa a personal coat of arms on the occasion of his admittance into the Royal Order of the Seraphim.

Cultural references
Lech Wałęsa has been portrayed, as himself or a character based on him, in a number of feature and television films. The two most notable of them are:
 Walesa. Man of Hope (2013) is a biographical drama by Oscar-winning filmmaker Andrzej Wajda about the lives of Wałęsa (Robert Więckiewicz) and his wife Danuta (Agnieszka Grochowska) from 1970 to 1989. It shows Wałęsa's change from a shipyard worker into a charismatic labor leader. The film was shot in the historical locations of the depicted events, including the former Lenin Shipyard. It won three awards, including Silver Hugo for Robert Więckiewicz at Chicago International Film Festival and a Pasinetti Award for Maria Rosaria Omaggio at Venice Film Festival, and was nominated for five more awards.

 Man of Iron (1981) is another Andrzej Wajda film about the Solidarity movement. The main character, a young worker Maciej Tomczyk (Jerzy Radziwiłowicz) is involved in the anti-Communist labor movement. Tomczyk is clearly portrayed as a parallel to Wałęsa, who appears as himself in the movie. The film was made during the brief relaxation of censorship in Poland between the formation of Solidarity in August 1980 and its suppression in December 1981. Waida was awarded both the Palme d'Or and the Prize of the Ecumenical Jury at the Cannes Film Festival for the film. In 1982, it was nominated for Oscar as the Best Foreign Language Film and gained seven other awards and nominations.

Both of these films were produced in Poland. In December 1989, Warner Bros. intended to produce a "major" movie about Wałęsa, to be made in 1990 and released in 1991. The company paid Wałęsa a $1 million fee for the rights to produce a biopic. Although the movie was never made, this payment sparked controversy in Poland when five years later it emerged that Wałęsa concealed this income to avoid paying taxes on it. The Gdańsk tax office initiated a tax fraud case against Wałęsa but it was later dismissed because the five-year statute of limitations had already run out.

 Polish actor Jacek Lenartowicz played Walesa in the 2005 television miniseries Pope John Paul II.

In 1982, Bono was inspired by Wałęsa to write U2's first hit single, "New Year's Day". Coincidentally, the Polish authorities lifted martial law on 1 January 1983, the same day this single was released. Wałęsa also became a hero of a number of Polish pop songs, including a satirical 1991 hit titled Nie wierzcie elektrykom (Don't Trust the Electricians) from the second studio album by the punk rock band Big Cyc which featured a caricature of Wałęsa on its cover.

Patrick Dailly's chamber opera Solidarity, starring Kristen Brown as Wałęsa, was premiered by the San Francisco Cabaret Opera in Berkeley, California, in September 2009.

Sid Meier's Civilization V video game lists Lech Wałęsa amongst its world leader rankings. Wałęsa is ranked 11th on a scale of 1 to 21, with Augustus Caesar ranked as the best world leader of all time and Dan Quayle as the worst. Wałęsa is immediately outranked by Simon Bolivar and is ranked just above Ivan the Terrible.  Lech Wałęsa ranks 9th out of 21 in Sid Meier's Civilization VI, immediately outranked by Marcus Aurelius and ranked just above Hatshepsut.

Publications

See also
 History of Poland
 List of Poles
 List of Polish Nobel laureates

Notes

References

External links

 of Lech Wałęsa Institute

Lech Wałęsa Biography and Interview with American Academy of Achievement
Polish Solidarity union leader Lech Walesa addresses joint meeting of the U.S. Congress
 
 

 
1943 births
20th-century Roman Catholics
21st-century Roman Catholics
Civic Platform politicians
Grand Collars of the Order of Liberty
Grand Collars of the Order of Prince Henry
Grand Croix of the Légion d'honneur
Grand Crosses of the Order of Christopher Columbus
Grand Crosses of the Order of Merit of the Republic of Hungary (civil)
Grand Crosses of the Order of Polonia Restituta
Grand Crosses of the Order of the Crown (Romania)
Grand Crosses of the Order of the White Lion
Grand Crosses Special Class of the Order of Merit of the Federal Republic of Germany
Honorary Knights Grand Cross of the Order of the Bath
Living people
Nobel Peace Prize laureates
Nonviolence advocates
People from Lipno County
People of the Cold War
Polish anti-abortion activists
Polish anti-communists
Polish democracy activists
Polish dissidents
Polish electricians
Polish Nobel laureates
Polish Roman Catholics
Polish Round Table Talks participants
Polish trade unionists
Politicians of Catholic political parties
Presidential Medal of Freedom recipients
Presidents of Poland
Recipients of the Order of Prince Yaroslav the Wise, 2nd class
Recipients of the Order of Saint James of the Sword
Recipients of the Order of the Cross of Terra Mariana, 1st Class
Roman Catholic activists
Solidarity (Polish trade union) activists
Solidarity Electoral Action politicians
Time Person of the Year
Candidates in the 1990 Polish presidential election
Candidates in the 1995 Polish presidential election
Candidates in the 2000 Polish presidential election
Recipients of the Medal of the Oriental Republic of Uruguay
Recipients of the Order of the White Eagle (Poland)
Recipients of the Ronald Reagan Freedom Award
Politicians awarded knighthoods